{{safesubst:#invoke:RfD||Regional Center|month = February
|day = 10
|year = 2023
|time = 00:10
|timestamp = 20230210001055

|content=
REDIRECT Regional centre (Singapore)

}}